Tanaecia pelea, the Malay viscount, is a species of butterfly of the family Nymphalidae.

Description
The basic colour of the upper wings is pale brown with pearly-bluish edges. It has dark brown marking on the basal area and a discal series of dark brown-edged hastate (spear-shaped) markings.

Distribution
It is found in Singapore, mainland Malaysia, Borneo, Nias and Pulau Tioman.

Subspecies
T. p. pelea (Malaya, Borneo)
T. p. heliophila (Nias)
T. p. irenae (Pulau Tioman)

Gallery

References
"Tanaecia Butler, [1869]" at Markku Savela's Lepidoptera and Some Other Life Forms
BioLib.cz
World Field Guide

External links
Butterflies in Indo-China
Nature love you

Tanaecia
Butterflies of Singapore
Butterflies of Borneo
Butterflies described in 1787